Joad is a family name and may refer to:
C. E. M. Joad (1891–1953), British philosopher
Tom Joad, fictional character from the 1939 John Steinbeck novel The Grapes of Wrath and the 1940 movie of the same name

See also
Jehoiada, biblical figure